Unnao Junction railway station is on the Lucknow–Kanpur Suburban Railway and Varanasi–Kanpur branch line. It is located in Unnao district in the Indian state of Uttar Pradesh. It serves Unnao and the surrounding areas.

History
In 1867, the Indian Branch Railway Company opened the Kanpur–Lucknow line.

The Oudh and Rohilkhand Railway opened the line from Varanasi to Lucknow in 1872.

Electrification
The Kanpur–Kanpur Bridge–Unnao–Lucknow section was electrified in 1999–2000.

References

External links
Trains at Unnao

Unnao
Railway stations in Unnao district
Lucknow NR railway division
Railway junction stations in Uttar Pradesh
Railway stations opened in 1867